Heystek is a Dutch name. It may refer to:

 Joost van der Westhuizen Heystek, a former South African rugby union footballer.
 Lamar Heystek, the youngest member of the City Council of Davis, California, United States since the Vietnam War.

Surnames